Rutherford County is a county located in the U.S. state of Tennessee. It is located in Middle Tennessee. As of a 2021 estimate, the population was 352,182, making it the fifth-most populous county in Tennessee. A study conducted by the University of Tennessee projects Rutherford County to become the third largest county in Tennessee by population by 2050. Its county seat is Murfreesboro, which is also the geographic center of Tennessee. As of 2010, it is the center of population of Tennessee. Rutherford County is included in the Nashville-Davidson–Murfreesboro–Franklin, TN Metropolitan Statistical Area.

History

Early history
Rutherford County was formed in 1803 from parts of Davidson, Williamson and Wilson counties, and named in honor of Griffith Rutherford (1721–1805). Rutherford was a North Carolina colonial legislator and an American Revolutionary War general, who settled in Middle Tennessee after the Revolution. He was appointed President of the Council of the Southwest Territory (the upper chamber of the territorial legislature) in 1794.

Civil War
Rutherford County strongly supported the Confederacy during the Civil War, having voted 2,392 to 73 in favor of Tennessee's Ordinance of Secession on June 8, 1861.

Rutherford County's central location and proximity to Nashville during the Civil War made it a contested area. The county was home to one of the bloodiest battles of the war, the Battle of Stones River, which was fought between December 31, 1862, and January 2, 1863.

On July 13, 1862, Confederate General Nathan Bedford Forrest conducted a series of cavalry operations known locally as Forrest's Raid. The raid successfully led to the surrender of all Union forces occupying the area. Soon after his departure, Union troops returned to the area and held it until the end of the war.

Reconstruction and latter 19th century

In August 1869, rampaging white men drove close to 100 African American farmers from their homes, and out of the county, to Nashville.

In 1884, Bradley Academy in Murfreesboro became Rutherford County's first accredited high school for African Americans.  The co-educational school was operated by the Murfreesboro City Schools system.  Bradley Academy was placed on the National Register of Historic Places in 1990.

Modern history
In the early 2000s, Muslim immigrants settled in the county, particularly in and around Murfreesboro. Their efforts to develop a mosque, the Islamic Center of Murfreesboro (and its subsequent replacement) became the focus of intense local controversy and opposition from non-Muslims, and were stymied by political and legal battles, arson, bomb threats and vandalism. A federal court forced the local authorities to allow the mosque, and opposition subsided, but sporadic incidents continued.

Geography

Adjacent counties
Wilson County (north)
Cannon County (east)
Coffee County (southeast)
Bedford County (south)
Marshall County (southwest)
Williamson County (west)
Davidson County (northwest)

National protected area
 Stones River National Battlefield

State protected areas
 Flat Rock Cedar Glades and Barrens State Natural Area
 Gattinger's Cedar Glade and Barrens State Natural Area (part)
 Long Hunter State Park (part)
 Manus Road Cedar Glade State Natural Area
 Overbridge State Natural Area
 Percy Priest Wildlife Management Area (part)
 Elsie Quarterman Cedar Glade State Natural Area
 Fate Sanders Barrens State Natural Area
 Sunnybell Cedar Glade State Natural Area
 Stones River Cedar Glade and Barrens State Natural Area
 Walterhill Floodplain State Natural Area

Demographics

2020 census

As of the 2020 United States census, there were 341,486 people, 113,797 households, and 78,348 families residing in the county.

2010 census
As of the census of 2010, there were 262,604 people, 96,232 households, and 66,810 families living in the county.  The population density was 424 people per square mile (114/km2), and the housing unit density was 156 units per square mile (44/km2). The racial makeup of the county was 80.67% White, 12.65% Black or African American, 3.08% Asian, 0.36% Native American, 0.05% Pacific Islander, and 2.04% from two or more races. Those of Hispanic or Latino origins were 6.67% of the population.

Of the 96,232 households, 35.19% had children under the age of 18 living in them, 51.61% were married couples living together, 5.04% had a male householder with no wife present, 12.77% had a female householder with no husband present, and 30.59% were non-families. 22.10% of all households were made up of individuals, and 5.38% had someone living alone who was 65 years of age or older. The average household size was 2.68 and the average family size was 3.14.

Of the 262,604 residents, 26.17% were under the age of 18, 65.62% were between the ages of 18 and 64, and 8.21% were 65 years of age and older. The median age was 33.1 years. 50.60% of all residents were female and 49.40% were male.

The median household income in the county was $53,770 and the median family income was $63,483. Males had a median income of $43,306 versus $35,437 for females. The per capita income was $24,390. About 8.8% of families and 12.7% of the population were below the poverty line, including 16.2% of those under the age of 18 and 7.4% of those age 65 and over.

2000 census
As of the 2000 census, there were 182,023 people, 66,443 households, and 47,440 families living in the county. The population density was 294 people per square mile (114/km2), and there were 70,616 housing units.  The racial makeup of the county was 85.73% White, 9.51% Black or African American, 1.90% Asian, 0.29% Native American, 0.04% Pacific Islander, 1.32% from other races, and 1.20% from two or more races. 2.78% of the population were Hispanic or Latino of any race.

There were 66,443 households, out of which 37.80% had children under the age of 18 living with them, 56.30% were married couples living together, 11.20% had a female head of household with no husband present, and 28.60% were non-families. 20.80% of all households were made up of individuals, and 5.10% had someone living alone who was 65 years of age or older.  The average household size was 2.65 and the average family size was 3.09.

In the county, the population was spread out, with 26.40% under the age of 18, 13.20% from 18 to 24, 33.50% from 25 to 44, 19.40% from 45 to 64, and 7.50% who were 65 years of age or older. The median age was 31 years. For every 100 females, there were 99.10 males.  For every 100 females age 18 and over, there were 97.20 males.

The median income for a household in the county was $46,312, and the median income for a family was $53,553. Males had a median income of $36,788 versus $26,555 for females. The per capita income for the county was $19,938. About 5.80% of families and 9.00% of the population were below the poverty line, including 8.50% of those under age 18 and 9.40% of those age 65 or over.

The 2010 census put the population of Rutherford County at 262,604. This represents a greater than 40% population growth since the 2000 U.S. Census. As of 2009, it was estimated that the total minority fraction of the population had grown to almost 20% of the total, with Hispanic population at 5.58%, African-American population at 12.09%, and Asian population at 2.66% of the total.

Government and politics

County Commission
The Board of County Commissioners, the county legislative body, consists of 21 members elected for four-year terms from single-member districts based on roughly equal populations. The county mayor is the chief executive officer and is elected from the county at-large.

Presidential politics

Political history
This area of the state was predominately Democratic following the American Civil War, but the significant minority of African Americans joined the Republican Party. The white-dominated state legislature in the 1880s passed four laws that effectively disenfranchised most blacks and many poor whites, particularly due to the requirement of payment of a poll tax in order to register to vote, which reduced the competitiveness of the Republican Party in this part of the state.

Since the late 20th century, the majority of white conservatives in Rutherford County shifted toward the Republican Party. Since this time, the changing demographics of the county has shown a significant increase in minorities; however, this change has resulted in no significant impact to party alignment. In recent years the county has favored Republican candidates for local, state, and national elections, although Democrats have improved their performance in elections.

Sheriff and jail
In 2008, the county built a $23,300,000 expansion to the county jail.  It is alleged that some county officials viewed the jail as a for-profit business.

In May 2016, Rutherford County Sheriff Robert Arnold, his  Chief Administrative Deputy Joe L. Russell, and the sheriff's uncle were named in a 14-count federal indictment charging fraud, bribery, extortion, obstruction of justice and conspiracy for operating an e-cigarette business, for personal gain, in the jail. State officials reported that the JailCigs business gained over $110,000 in revenues pocketed by Arnold and Russell. All pleaded guilty. Arnold was sentenced to 50 months in federal prison, his deputy to 15 months. Sheriff Mike Fitzhugh replaced Arnold. Sheriff's Major Terry McBurney pleaded guilty to unrelated charges, losing his citizenship.

In December 2016, following multiple deaths in the jail that year, including two suicides (one resulting in a $260,000 lawsuit settlement against the County), state inspectors decertified the jail, citing faults in the jail's policies, programs, staffing and the physical plant. Following numerous changes to policies and facilities—particularly inmate supervision and monitoring, and converting 400 beds to bunk beds, to allow the jail to hold 950 people—the jail was recertified in 2017.

Juvenile justice and jail

In 2000, Rutherford County created the post of Juvenile Court Judge to oversee the county's juvenile justice procedures.

As part of the $23 million development of the county jail, in 2008, a juvenile detention center (JDC) was added. Some county officials allegedly viewed the juvenile jail as a for-profit business. At a public meeting, JDC director Lynn Duke stated that, “If we have empty beds, we will fill them with a paying customer" and "We get a lot of business” A county commissioner added, that "Hey, it’s a business. Generating revenue."

The county then solicited other counties in Tennessee and surrounding states to send detained youth to the Rutherford County juvenile jail for incarceration, at $175 per day per child, and said that over 20 Tennessee counties had contracted with Rutherford's juvenile jail. The county released a marketing video, "What Can the Rutherford County Juvenile Detention Center Do For You?” featuring images of children in black-and-white striped prison uniforms, and narrated by Juvenile Court Judge Donna Scott Davenport, to solicit business for the JDC. As of 2021, 39 Tennessee counties were contracting with Rutherford County to incarcerate youth, along with the U.S. Marshals Service.

It is alleged that in subsequent years, the singular Rutherford County juvenile judge and local authorities, including the county's Juvenile Detention Center director Lynn Duke, colluded in the arrest and incarceration of hundreds of children, some as young as seven years old, on various misdemeanor charges, including schoolyard fights, truancy and cursing. All arrested children were jailed in the detention center, pending adjudication and assessment.

In 2021, journalists reported that children were being incarcerated in the county's juvenile jail at a rate ten times higher than the state's average, and that some children were arrested and jailed for alleged violations of non-existent laws.  Class action federal lawsuits resulted in the county ending solitary confinement of children in custody. In May 2017, a federal court said that children were being illegally detained in Rutherford County, and ordered the county to stop using its "filter" system because it "departs drastically" from ordinary juvenile detention standards.

In June 2021, Rutherford County settled with plaintiffs in a class action lawsuit, agreeing to payments of up to $11 million, to up to 1,450 potential claimants for wrongful arrest or incarceration, but denying any wrongdoing. The settlement amount was amended to $5.1 million in December 2021. The settlement was subsequently denied by the county's insurer, Lloyd's of London, which wrote that the county was aware of its illegal juvenile detention practices prior to its coverage by the insurer, but "concealed or misrepresented material facts" to obtain the policy, which voided the policy; the county filed a federal lawsuit against the insurer in December 2022.

In August 2022, Republican Juvenile Court nominee Travis Lampley won the judgeship, stating the  goals of restoring confidence in the juvenile court, and pledged "to uphold the integrity of the family unit", while the Rutherford County Commission is assembling a new Juvenile Detention Board to "oversee incarceration operations", including juvenile detention staff, who report to Judge Davenport.

Privatized corrections
Rutherford County outsourced some of its probation administration to Providence Community Corrections, and, in 2015, the arrangement was alleged in court to have violated racketeering laws—jailing impoverished people who did not pay court fines for misdemeanor offenses and traffic violations, and refusing to waive fees for indigent convicts. Seven probationers, many sick or disabled, living on food stamps, charged in court that they lost housing, jobs, cars—after multiple threats from Providence that they would be jailed for failing to pay.  In 2017, Rutherford County consented to end the use of for-profit, private probation companies, and PCC agreed to pay $14 million, spread among up to 25,000 court-identified victims, to settle the class action lawsuit.

Economy
The top employers in the county are listed below. Rutherford County government including Rutherford County Schools also employ 6,028 individuals.

Murfreesboro
Middle Tennessee State University: 2,205
National Healthcare: 2,071
City of Murfreesboro: 1,912
State Farm Insurance: 1,650
Amazon.com: 1,550
Saint Thomas Rutherford: 1,400
Alvin C. York Veterans Administration Medical Center: 1,300

Smyrna and La Vergne
Nissan Motor Company: 8,000
Ingram Content Group: 2,048
Asurion: 1,050
Vi-Jon (personal care products): 737
Stonecrest Medical Center (hospital): 550

The county is also home to Barrett Firearms Manufacturing and a General Mills production facility.

Communities

Cities
Eagleville
La Vergne
Murfreesboro (county seat)

Town
Smyrna

Census-designated places
Christiana
Rockvale
Walterhill

Unincorporated communities
Allisona (partial)
 Almaville
 Barfield
Blackman
 Cedar Grove
 Florence
 Fosterville
Kittrell
Lascassas
 Midland
Milton
 Overall
Readyville (partial)
 Salem
Versailles
Windrow

See also
National Register of Historic Places listings in Rutherford County, Tennessee

References

External links

Official site
Rutherford County Chamber of Commerce
Judge Donna Scott Davenport oversees the juvenile justice system in Rutherford County, Tennessee

 
1803 establishments in Tennessee
Populated places established in 1803
Nashville metropolitan area
Middle Tennessee